Vaison-la-Romaine is a town in the Vaucluse department in the Provence-Alpes-Côte d'Azur region in southeastern France.

Vaison-la-Romaine is famous for its rich Roman ruins and mediaeval town and cathedral. It is also unusual in the way the antique, mediaeval and modern towns spanning 2,000 years of history lie close together.

The old town is split into two parts: the "upper city" or Colline du Château on a hill on one side of the Ouvèze, and on the opposite bank, the "lower city" centred on the Colline de la Villasse.

With four theatres and numerous exhibitions and galleries, Vaison-la-Romaine is also renowned for its art scene. Many writers, painters and actors live in the area.

History
The area was inhabited in the Bronze Age. At the end of the fourth century BC Vaison became the capital of a Celtic tribe, the Vocontii, centred on the oppidum in the upper city.

The Roman Period
After the Roman conquest (125-118 BC) in the wars against the Salyes, the Vocontii retained a certain degree of autonomy; they had two capitals, Luc-en-Diois, apparently the religious centre, and Vaison which was named Vasio Julia Vocontiorum. Their authority continued in the gradual Romanisation of the Celtic oppidum. Early building was probably done by Vocontian aristocrats who moved down from the oppidum and established houses along the river, around which the city eventually accreted but based on a Roman orthogonal street plan with different alignment from the earlier houses.

Construction of large public monuments began in the second half of the 1st century: theatre, bridge, aqueducts, thermal baths. Two aqueducts provided water to the city; the older one had its source on the Sainte-Croix hill to the north, while the longer one's source was at the Groseau spring on Mont Ventoux 10 km to the south-east.

The Pax Romana led to the extension of the city which was at its finest in the second century when it covered up to 75 hectares. It became one of the richest of Gallia Narbonensis; many houses with numerous mosaic pavements have been discovered and there is a fine theatre on a rocky hillslope, probably built during the reign of Tiberius, whose statue was found in a prominent place on site. The beautiful statue, the Vaison Diadumenos, (now in the British Museum) was also discovered in the theatre in the nineteenth century.

The barbarian invasions were presaged by pillaging and burning in 276, from which Roman Vasio recovered. Vaison became a relatively important Christian religious centre (a bishopric existed there from the 4th century) where two councils met in 442 and 529.

The Post-Roman Period

The barbaric invasions of the 5th century by the Burgundians ruined the city.  The theatre's benches began to be reused as Christian tombstones. Vaison was taken by the Ostrogoths in 527 then by Chlothar I, King of the Franks, in 545 and became part of Provence.

The disputes which broke out in the twelfth century between the counts of Provence, who had refortified the ancient "upper town" and the bishops, each of whom were in possession of half the town, were injurious to its prosperity; they were ended by a treaty negotiated in 1251 by the future pope Clement IV, a native of Saint-Gilles-du-Gard.

In disturbed times of the Middle Ages, the inhabitants migrated to higher ground on the left bank of Ouvèze, with the shelter of the ramparts and a strong castle. From the eighteenth century, most of the population moved back down to the plains by the river.

A flood struck Vaison-la-Romaine on 22 September 1992, the worst since 1632.

Population

Main sights

The Roman ruins lie in the valley on the banks of the river Ouvèze which is crossed by a Roman bridge from the 1st century AD. The Roman ruins are located in two main areas: La Villasse and Puymin.

Several large and rich town houses have been excavated:
 the house of the Dolphin (area 2700 m2)
 the house of the Laurelled Apollo (area 2000 m2)
 the house of the Arbour (area 3000 m2)
 the house of the Peacock (area 1000 m2)

The houses must have belonged to the Vocontii aristocracy who owned estates in the region.

A large number of finds originating from Vaison-la-Romaine are now dispersed among 25 museums worldwide, mostly in Europe and North America.

The mediaeval town is high on the rocky hill as attacks were frequent and the town retreated to a more defensible position.

The apse of the Church of St. Quenin, dedicated to Saint Quinidius, seems to date from the eighth century, one of the oldest in France. The cathedral dates from the 11th century, but the apse and the apsidal chapels are from the Merovingian period.

The town also has a famous open air market held on Tuesdays year round.

The house of the Dolphin

The Dolphin House owes its name to a white marble fountainhead portraying a cupid riding a dolphin. The structure
of the house indicates it was built in stages over a period of about 250 years. About 30 BC it was a farmhouse of area 1,400 m2 built on a different alignment to the later street grid and with main entrance to the south. The main building consisted of four rooms arranged around a colonnaded courtyard (peristyle). To the west lay several agricultural outbuildings and a small heated building, probably a thermal bath. 50 years later, water and sewage pipes were added leading to greatly improved living standards. Around 80 AD, the house was extended over the strip of land up to the new pedestrian street. A new main entrance was built to the north, the peristyle was extended eastwards and adorned with a pond and the upper floor was enlarged.

The private section of the house consists of rooms arranged around the peristyle, including the upper floor accessed by the staircase next to the tablinum.

Twin towns
 Martigny, Switzerland.

See also
 Ancient Diocese of Vaison
 Belisama
 Council of Vaison
 Dentelles de Montmirail
 Vgo (stonemason)

Gallery

Notable residents
 Gnaeus Pompeius Trogus, (1st century BC) was born in Vaison-la-Romaine, historian.
 Maurice Burrus, Alsatian tobacco magnate, politician and philatelist
 Alice Colonieu, French ceramicist, painter and sculptor
 Michel Jeury, French science fiction writer
 Mimie Mathy, French actress, comedian and singer
 Keira Knightley, English actress, owns a house in the area
 Henri Metzger (1912–2007), French archaeologist and Hellenist died here.

References

Sources
Rivet, A. L. F. '1988. Gallia Narbonensis: Southern Gaul in Roman Times, part II: "Civitates", (London: Batsford). A brief summary of the archaeology.

External links

 

 Vaison-la-Romaine official website
 The medieval town of Vaison-la-Romaine (in French and English)
Association pour la Protection de la Haute Ville

Archaeological sites in France
Communes of Vaucluse
Roman towns and cities in Provence
Vocontii